This list of undefeated mixed martial artists excludes mixed martial artists with fewer than 7 wins.

See also 
List of female mixed martial artists
List of mixed martial artists with the most sanctioned fights
List of male mixed martial artists

References

Undefeated mixed martial artists